The Cathedral Basilica of St. Augustine is a historic cathedral in St. Augustine, Florida, and the seat of the Catholic Bishop of St. Augustine. It is located at 38 Cathedral Place between Charlotte and St. George Streets. Constructed over five years (1793–1797), it was designated a U.S. National Historic Landmark on April 15, 1970. Its congregation, established in 1565, is the oldest Christian congregation in the contiguous United States.

History
In the mid-1560s, as the Spanish Empire expanded northward from the Caribbean to unexplored Florida, it founded the colony of St. Augustine, which has become the oldest continuously occupied European settlement on the United States mainland. Spanish settlers immediately established a shrine of the Catholic Church, the religion essential to the Spanish monarchy throughout its history. From the mid-1500s to the mid-1600s, the kingdom was undergoing a Catholic Revival in opposition to the Protestant Reformation.

As the early colonists were mostly sailors or soldiers with little expertise in architecture, the first church of St. Augustine was simply designed and rapidly built of disparate materials. The original parish was short-lived, burning to the ground in a 1586 attack on the town by the Englishman Sir Francis Drake. As two decades previously, the colonists hastily built a new church of straw and palmetto, which deteriorated quickly in the humid climate and burned down in 1599.

A tithe was raised in Spain, and in 1605 a third church was built, this time more permanently of timber by experienced architects and builders who had begun to make their way to the New World. For 95 years it stayed intact, though in disrepair, before again burning down in 1702 during a failed English attempt on the city by South Carolina colonist James Moore.

The church vanished for over ninety years, despite an attempt to rebuild in 1707, with royal rebuilding funds misspent on provisions, soldiers' pay, and graft by public officials. During the first half of the 18th century, priests held mass in St. Augustine's hospital, which became too small for the congregation and embarrassed it before the Native American converts to Catholicism.

From 1763 to 1784, Florida fell under British rule, and reconstruction was forgotten. After Spain regained the colony in 1784, a new sense of pride in the citizenry led to large-scale construction of the Cathedral of St. Augustine from 1793 to 1797.

Architecture
The cathedral's eclectic facade is a combination of Spanish mission and Neoclassical styles. Spanish mission features include curving bell gables, limited fenestration, clay roof tiles, a semicircular tympanum, prominent statuary niche, and comparatively unadorned walls. Neoclassical details surround the entry door; an entablature embellished with triglyphs is topped with a broken pediment above and supported by pairs of Doric columns below.

On April 12, 1887, with Florida a part of the United States, the old Spanish structure burned once again, but the coquina blocks and cement masonry of the exterior were still salvageable. Reconstruction was begun with donations from Henry Flagler and funds raised in a national appeal. The congregation hired the visiting New York City architect James Renwick, Jr., who rebuilt and enlarged the church with a rectangular-cruciform layout and a European-style transept.

Renwick devised an elegant roof truss system that exposed the decorated timbers, and he added a Spanish Renaissance-style bell tower, its exposed bell typical of older Spanish mission churches in the west. Four bells were placed in the tower, one salvaged from a previous church and inscribed: "Sancte Joseph. Ora Pro Nobis. D 1682."; another taken from a British cathedral.

The coquina stone walls, which had saved the old structure from the flames, were of an unusual material apparently inspired by Native American building techniques. Coquina is a sedimentary rock from the deposition of seashells on ancient shorelines, and could be cheaply quarried and transported to the town. The wet quarry stone hardens when exposed to air, but remains soft enough to be easily worked, serving as a very convenient material. However, the new walls, including the bell tower, were made of modern cast-in-place concrete.

Gallery

See also
 List of Catholic cathedrals in the United States
List of cathedrals in Florida

References

External links

 
 
 
 
 

Augustine, Cathedral Basilica of
Roman Catholic Diocese of Saint Augustine
National Historic Landmarks in Florida
National Register of Historic Places in St. Johns County, Florida
Churches on the National Register of Historic Places in Florida
Augustine, Cathedral Basilica of
Churches in St. Augustine, Florida
Tourist attractions in St. Augustine, Florida
Historic American Buildings Survey in Florida
Spanish-American culture in Florida
Churches completed in 1797
1797 establishments in North America